George Mills (23 March 1867 – 13 March 1942) was a New Zealand cricketer. He played first-class cricket for Auckland, Hawke's Bay and Otago between 1887 and 1903.

Life and career
Mills's family migrated from England to New Zealand in 1873, sailing on the Berar. George Mills was one of Auckland's leading players in the 1890s. His brothers Edward and Isaac also played for Auckland. 

Mills had a spectacular first-class debut in 1886-87 against Wellington, bowling unchanged through both innings and taking 7 for 36 and 3 for 34, as well as scoring 39 not out at number 11 in an innings victory. His bowling later fell away and he bowled little later in his career. He spent a few years in Melbourne, where he played senior cricket for Essendon from 1889 to 1892. 

Returning to New Zealand, Mills scored Auckland's first first-class century when he made 106 against Wellington in 1895-96; nobody else in the match made more than 51, and Auckland won by four wickets. He also made the match top score, 80, against Canterbury in 1897-98. Along with his brother Isaac, he toured Australia in 1898-99 in New Zealand's first overseas touring team.

He married Louisa Carruthers in Melbourne in 1891. They had two daughters and two sons, one of whom, Jack, played Test cricket for New Zealand in the 1930s. George spent 45 years as a groundsman, including spells at Essendon and at Carisbrook in Dunedin. For 30 years he was in charge of the Eden Park ground in Auckland, which he transformed from a stony paddock into a first-class cricket ground in 1914 and a Test ground in 1930.

See also
 List of Otago representative cricketers
 List of Auckland representative cricketers

References

External links
 

1867 births
1942 deaths
New Zealand cricketers
Pre-1930 New Zealand representative cricketers
Auckland cricketers
Hawke's Bay cricketers
Otago cricketers
Sportspeople from Dartford
Groundskeepers
North Island cricketers